Mir Business Bank (formerly Melli Iran) is a Russian bank with a 100% participation of foreign capital; its founder and the only shareholder is Bank Melli Iran (Tehran). Mir Business Bank was registered in January 2002 and received a license for banking operations from the Central Bank of Russia on April 15 (No. 3396). The bank has a branch in Astrakhan and planned to open one more branch in Kazan. In October 2017, the bank was supposed to integrate with the Shetab Banking System. In November 2018, the bank was among the financial institutions included in the sanction list of the US Treasury.

References

Literature

External links 
 

Banks of Russia
Companies based in Moscow
Banks established in 2002
Russian companies established in 2002